Chernigovka is a rural locality (a selo) and the administrative center of Chernigovsky District, Primorsky Krai, Russia. Population:

History
Chernigovka was established in 1886 by a group of 25 families from the village of Mutin in the Krolevetsky district of the Chernigov province. The migrants chose a comfortable plain surrounded by wooded hills and a small river, and named the village after their former home, the Chernigov province.

References

Notes

Sources

Rural localities in Primorsky Krai